Temagamite is a bright white palladium mercury telluride mineral with a hardness of  on the Mohs scale. Its chemical formula is Pd3HgTe3. It was discovered at the Temagami Mine on Temagami Island, Lake Temagami in 1973, and it represents a rare mineral in the Temagami Greenstone Belt.

It occurs as microscopic inclusions within massive chalcopyrite at Temagami in association with other rare tellurides: merenskyite, stützite, hessite and an unnamed Pd-Hg-Ag telluride. In addition to the discovery locality, it has been reported from the Stillwater igneous complex in Montana and the New Rambler copper–nickel mine in the Medicine Bow Mountains of Wyoming.

See also
List of minerals

References

Telluride minerals
Palladium minerals
Mercury minerals
Geology of Temagami
Orthorhombic minerals
Minerals described in 1973